Bed for Two; Rendezvous with Luck, is a French comedy film from 1950, directed by Emil-Edwin Reinert, written by André-Paul Antoine, and starring Henri Guisol. The film features Louis de Funès. It is based on Gilles Dupé's novel "Le lit à deux places".

Cast 
 Danielle Delorme: Michèle
 Henri Guisol: Robert Bobin
 Suzanne Flon: Blanche Pidoux-Bobin
 Jean Brochard: Mr. Gauffre
 Louis de Funès: the waiter
 Dora Doll : Miss Paulette
 Geneviève Morel: Misses Justin, the concierge
 Georges Paulais: inspector

References

External links 
 
 Rendez-vous avec la chance (1950) at the Films de France
 Rendez-vous avec la chance (1950) at Unifrance films
 Rendez-vous avec la chance (1950) at the Cinema français 

1950 films
French comedy films
1950s French-language films
French black-and-white films
Films directed by Emil-Edwin Reinert
1950 comedy films
1950s French films